Gârdani is a commune in Maramureș County, Crișana, Romania. It is composed of a single village, Gârdani, part of Sălsig Commune until being split off in 2004.

The commune is located in the western part of the county, on the border with Satu Mare County.

At the 2011 census, Gârdani had a population of 1,151; of those, 96% were ethnic Romanians.

References

Communes in Maramureș County
Localities in Crișana